From the Summersteps website:

Extras
The DVD includes the video for "The Murderess" from The Metal West album.

References

2006 video albums
2006 live albums
Live video albums
Kid Icarus (band) albums